Eduardo Milán is a Uruguayan author who has written over twenty books of poetry, several collections of criticism, and two anthologies of Spanish-language poetry. He was born in Rivera, Uruguay, in 1952.  His mother died when he was a year old, and when he was a teenager his father was sent to prison for being affiliated with the Tupamaro guerrilla movement.

Works

Books of Poetry
 Manto (1996) 
 Alegrial (1997) (Aguascalientes National Poetry Award )
 Razón de amor y acto de fe (2001)
 Querencia, gracia y otros poemas (2003)

Collections of Essays
 Una cierta mirada (1998)
 Trata de no ser constructor de ruinas (2003)

Translations to other languages
 Estação da Fábula: poemas de Eduardo Milán. Edição bilingüe. Tradução de Claudio Daniel.  São Paulo: Fundação Memorial da América Latina, 2002. 77 pp. 
 Selected poems. Bilingual edition. Edited by Antonio Ochoa. Translated from Spanish by John Oliver Simon, Patrick Madden & Steven Stewart. Bristol: Shearsman Books, 2012. 150 pp.  
 Selected Essays. Edited by Antonio Ochoa. Shearsman Books, 2016.

References 

People from Rivera Department
20th-century Uruguayan poets
Mexican poets
Living people
21st-century Uruguayan poets
21st-century Uruguayan male writers
21st-century Mexican male writers
Uruguayan male poets
20th-century Mexican male writers
Year of birth missing (living people)